The Kerala State Excise is the law enforcement agency for excise in state of Kerala, India. Kerala Excise has its headquarters in Thiruvananthapuram, the state capital. The department administers laws related to liquor, narcotic drugs and psychotropic substances, medicinal preparations containing alcohol and narcotics. The Kerala Excise Academy and Research Centre, Thrissur trains the excise officers and that runs full-term basic courses for Exicse Inspectors, Exicse Preventive Officers, Civil Exicse Officers, Women Civil Exicse Officers and Exicse Drivers. The head of the state excise is the Excise Commissioner who is of the rank of Director General of Police (DGP)/Additional Director General of Police (ADGP). The current commissioner of Exicse is Ananthakrishnan, IPS. The Exicse Commissioner reports to the Exicse Minister of Kerala, who is the chief executive of the state.

Duties
The principal duties of the department are protection, augmentation and collection of excise revenue and enforcement of the above acts and various rules made there under. The department prevents leakage of revenue, and exerts effective control on the abuse of liquor and intoxicating drugs. The duties of the department are broadly classified as collection of revenue, enforcement activity to prevent illicit liquor production, sale and trafficking and Campaign against alcoholism. Liquor includes spirits of wine, arrack, spirits, wine, toddy, beer and all liquid consisting of or containing alcohol. Individual has no fundamental right over the manufacture and trade of liquor. Absolute right on liquor is vested with the state. The government formulates Abkari policy of the state every year. The policy formulated by the state government is implemented by the Excise Department.

Organizational structure
For the convenience of administration, the State of Kerala is divided into three zones headed by joint excise commissioners.
 South Zone with headquarters at Thiruvananthapuram
 Central Zone with headquarters at Ernakulam
 North Zone with headquarters at Kozhikode
Fourteen excise divisions come under the above three zones which are coterminous with the 14 revenue districts of the state, headed by deputy excise commissioners. In each division there is an assistant excise commissioner for supervision of enforcement activities.  Each division is further divided into excise circles, which are co-terminus to the revenue taluk of the state under the control of circle inspectors of Excise. Each circle comprises one or more excise ranges, which are the micro level unit of the Excise Department and the primary enforcement unit headed by excise inspectors.

Hierarchy

Officers 

 Excise Commissioner
 Addl Excise Commissioner
 Joint Excise Commissioner 
 Deputy Excise Commissioner
 Assistant Excise Commissioner
 Circle Inspector
 Excise Inspector
 Assistant Excise Inspector

Sub-ordinates 

 Assistant Excise Inspector (Grade)
 Preventive Officer
 Civil Excise Officer
 Excise Driver

References

Further reading
Custodial Deaths
Corruption

Government departments of Kerala
State taxation in India
State agencies of Kerala
Specialist law enforcement agencies of India
Government agencies with year of establishment missing
1998 establishments in Kerala
Government agencies established in 1998